Ellen Cashman (1845 – 4 January 1925) was an Irish nurse, restaurateur, businesswoman and philanthropist in Arizona, Alaska, British Columbia and Yukon.

Cashman led a rescue party to miners to the Cassiar Country gold mine   in the Cassiar Mountains of British Columbia earning her the nickname "Angel of the Cassiar". In Tombstone, Arizona,  Cashman raised money to build the Sacred Heart Catholic Church, and did charitable work with the Sisters of St. Joseph. She went to the Yukon during the Klondike Gold Rush for gold prospecting, working there until 1905.  She became nationally known as a frontierswoman, with the Associated Press covering a later trip.

In 2006, Cashman was inducted into the Alaska Mining Hall of Fame.

Biography
Ellen "Nellie" Cashman was born in Midleton, County Cork in the mid 1840s. Some sources give 1844 as her year of birth, while some other research indicates she was the Ellen Cashman baptised on 15 October 1845. Her family lived on Free School Lane (now known as Mc Donaghs Lane). Cashman was brought to the United States around 1850 by her mother, along with her sister Frances (known as Fanny); they settled first in Boston.

As an adolescent, Cashman worked as a bellhop in a Boston hotel. In 1865, she and her family moved to San Francisco, California.

British Columbia
Cashman left her family home in 1874 for the Cassiar Country in British Columbia. She set up a boarding house for miners at Telegraph Creek, asking for donations to the Sisters of St Anne in return for the services available at her boarding house. Cashman was travelling to Victoria to deliver 500 dollars to the sisters of St. Anne when she heard that a snowstorm had descended on the Cassiar Mountains, stranding and injuring 26 miners, who were also suffering from scurvy. She took charge of a six-man search party and collected food and medicine to take to the stranded miners. Conditions in the Cassiar Mountains were so dangerous that the Canadian Army advised against attempting the rescue. Upon learning of Cashman's expedition, a commander sent his troops to locate her party and bring them to safety. An army trooper eventually found Cashman camped on the frozen surface of the Stikine River. After 77 days of harsh weather, Cashman and her party located the sick men, who numbered far more than 26. Some historical accounts credit Cashman with saving the lives of as many as 75 men. She administered a diet containing Vitamin C to restore the men to health. She was afterward fondly known in the region as the "Angel of the Cassiar".

Arizona

About 1880, Cashman moved to Tombstone, Arizona. She raised money to build the Sacred Heart Catholic Church, and committed herself to charity work with the Sisters of St. Joseph. She took a position as a nurse in a Cochise County hospital, but also opened another restaurant and boarding house.

Her sister Fanny Cunningham was widowed in 1881. Cashman arranged for Fanny and her five children to move to nearby Tucson, Arizona. Fanny died in 1884 of tuberculosis, leaving her children in Cashman's care.

In December 1883, bandits committed the Bisbee massacre in Tombstone, killing four innocent bystanders and wounding two others in the course of a robbery. The five men were convicted and sentenced to die by hanging on 28 March 1884.  The hangings proceeded as scheduled, but out of public view. When Cashman learned that a medical school planned to exhume the bodies of the convicts for study, she enlisted two prospectors to stand watch over the Boot Hill Cemetery for 10 days.

Cashman and her associate Joseph Pascholy co-owned and ran a restaurant and hotel in  Tombstone, Arizona  called Russ House, now known as The Nellie Cashman Restaurant.

Yukon and Alaska
In 1898, Cashman left Arizona for the Yukon in search of gold, staying until 1905. Her prospecting ventures took her to Klondike, Fairbanks and Nolan Creek  in Yukon-Koyukuk County, Alaska. She later owned a store in Dawson City, Yukon.  She subsequently settled in Koyukuk, Alaska, along with other established miners.

In January 1925, Cashman developed pneumonia and rheumatism. Friends admitted her to the Sisters of St. Anne, the same hospital which she had helped to build fifty-one years earlier. She died there, and was interred at Ross Bay Cemetery in Victoria, British Columbia.

Legacy and honors
The 1959–1960 season of the ABC western television series, The Life and Legend of Wyatt Earp, with Hugh O'Brian starring as Wyatt Earp, featured a fictional character based on Nellie Cashman played by actress Randy Stuart (1924–1996).
Grace Lee Whitney played Cashman in "The Angel of Tombstone" of the syndicated western series Death Valley Days, hosted by Robert Taylor.

On 18 October 1994, Cashman was featured on a United States postage stamp as part of the Legends of the West series.

On 15 March 2006, Nellie Cashman was inducted posthumously into the Alaska Mining Hall of Fame.
In 2007, she was inducted into the National Cowgirl Museum and Hall of Fame in Fort Worth, Texas.

In June 2014, a monument in Nellie's honour was erected near her home in Midleton Co. Cork.

References

Other sources 
Don Chaput, (1995)  Nellie Cashman, and the North American Mining Frontier (Tucson, Westernlore Press) 
Ronald Wayne Fischer  (2000) Nellie Cashman: Frontier Angel, (Talei Publishers) 
John P. Clum  (1931) "Nellie Cashman," Arizona Historical Review, v. iii, 9–34.
 Illing, Thora Kerr  (2016)  Gold Rush Queen: the extraordinary life of Nellie Cashman (Touchwood Editions) 
Claire Rudolf Murphy and Jane G. Haigh  (1997) "Nellie Cashman," in Gold Rush Women  (Alaska Northwest Books, p. 112–116)

Related  reading
Melanie J. Mayer, 1989, Klondike Women, Ohio University Press.
 Anon. (1999). The Islander, Portraits of Cobh, (No.3), Cobh Museum, Co. Cork, 1999.

External links

Charlene Porsild (2005). "Cashman, Ellen", Dictionary of Canadian Biography Online

Kathy Weiser (2017). "Nellie Cashman – Pioneering the Mining Camps", Legends of America

1845 births
1925 deaths
People from County Cork
Businesspeople from Boston
Businesspeople from San Francisco
American women restaurateurs
American restaurateurs
American gold prospectors
Canadian gold prospectors
People of the Klondike Gold Rush
People from Dawson City
Cassiar Country
19th-century Irish businesspeople
20th-century Irish philanthropists
Irish explorers of North America
Female explorers
Arizona pioneers
People from Tombstone, Arizona
Cowgirl Hall of Fame inductees
20th-century Irish businesswomen
19th-century Irish philanthropists